Universitas 21 (U21) is an international network of research-intensive universities. Founded in Melbourne, Australia in 1997 with 11 members, it has grown to include twenty-eight member universities in nineteen countries and territories.

The universities collaborate on student experience, researcher engagement and educational innovation. It offers various student competitions including the Three Minute Thesis (3MT), the U21/PwC Innovation Challenge and the RISE (Real Impact on Society and Environment) Showcase.

Since 2012, Universitas 21 has commissioned the "U21 Ranking of National Higher Education Systems". Produced by researchers at the University of Melbourne, this ranking aims to show which countries create a "strong environment" that allows universities to contribute to growth, provide a high-quality student experience and help institutions compete globally. It evaluates the standing of national higher education systems by providing rankings in four broad areas: resources, environment, connectivity and output. The rankings are then combined to provide an overall ranking. The ranking is then adjusted by GDP per capita, which allows countries to be compared to others at a similar stage of economic development.

Universitas 21 has Consultative Status with the Economic & Social Affairs Council (ECOSOC).

Members

U21Global

U21Global was a for-profit university formed in June 2001 in Singapore as a joint venture between Universitas 21 and Thomson Learning (which later became Cengage Learning).

In late 2007, Cengage Learning sold its entire 50% in U21Global share to Mauritius-based Manipal Universal Learning International for an undisclosed sum. In 2010, the Universitas 21 shareholding was diluted to 25 per cent, with only 10 universities continuing to hold equity. The university now trades as GlobalNxt University and has no remaining connection with Universitas 21.

See also
List of higher education associations and alliances

Notes

References

External links 
 U21 Universitas21

International college and university associations and consortia